Maria Cristina, Queen of Spain may refer to:

 Maria Christina of Bourbon-Two Sicilies, wife of Ferdinand VII of Spain
 Maria Christina of Austria, wife of Alfonso XII of Spain